This is a list of films which have placed number one at the weekend box office in Romania during 2022.

List

Highest-grossing films

Teambuilding became the 15th film and 2nd romanian film to pass the 10 million lei mark, 2nd film and 1st romanian film to pass the 20 million lei mark. Avatar: The Way of Water became the 16th film to pass the 10 million lei mark, and 3rd film to pass the 20 million lei mark. Both movies were the first to sell over 1 million tickets since 1998's Titanic.

References 

Romania